Javed Bashir (Punjabi, ; born 8 August 1973) is a Pakistani playback singer who mainly sings classical songs. Javed has sung songs for many Bollywood movies including Cocktail, Kahaani, Rush, Bombay Talkies, Bhaag Milkha Bhaag, and Once Upon ay Time in Mumbai Dobaara!.

Early life
Javed Bashir's parents moved from Jalandhar, Punjab, British India, to Pakistan during the Partition. Though he has been singing since childhood, the professional training of qawwali began from 1992 with his father Ustad Bashir Ahmed Khan, himself a well-known qawwal. Javed Bashir also took classical vocal training from his uncle Ustad Mubarak Ali Khan. His younger brother Akbar Ali is a qawwal as well, and both have performed together, notably for the season 10 of Coke Studio Pakistan, with the song "Naina Moray".

Music career
Javed Bashir started his solo singing career in 2001 by singing his debut song "Deewane Nachde" from the album Anything But Silent by Bally Sagoo. Javed Bashir's lucky break came when Mekaal Hasan of the Mekaal Hasan Band called him on board to join his band. He was featured on Sampooran, the band's first full-length album in 2004, It landed Bashir mainstream success and appreciation. The band's popular song "Chal Bulleya" was released in 2009 from the album Saptak in collaboration with Mekaal Hasan Band. After the release of "Chal Bulleya", Javed and the band parted ways owing to differences on musical terms. Javed has since been working on a musical project for Indo-Pak peace in collaboration with Shankar Mahadevan. Javed Bashir also released an album, Subrang, in 2011. Another of his albums is Vanga Ishq Diyan. He also sang in Coke Studio Season 2 and Season 7.

Coke Studio Pakistan

Discography

Television and reality shows

Javed Bashir has also sung a couple of original sound tracks for Pakistani TV Serials.

Lollywood (Pakistani Cinema)

Javed Bashir has recently made his debut in the movie Moor. He has also sung a song in the movie Manto.

Pollywood (Indian Punjabi Cinema) 

Bashir made his debut in the Punjabi movie Mitti Na Pharol Jogiya. He has sung the title song of this movie.

Bollywood

Javed Bashir made his entry in Bollywood through A. R. Rahman's scored movie Yuva, in which his presence was heard in background score where he sang Alaps and Sargams. He debuted in Bollywood as playback singer with Kahaani's "Piya Tu Kaahe Rootha Re" composed by Vishal–Shekhar. Next came "Tera Naam Japdi Phiran" from Cocktail. Pritam composed the music for that film. He also sang "O Re Khuda" for him for another film that year, Rush. The year 2013 began with the solo track "Murabba" from Bombay Talkies. His latest songs include "Mera Yaar" and "O Rangrez" from the movie Bhaag Milkha Bhaag, composed by Shankar–Ehsaan–Loy, and "Ye Tune Kya Kiya" from Once Upon Ay Time in Mumbai Dobaara!, with music by Pritam.

Awards and nominations

Javed Bashir's first Bollywood nomination was in Mirchi Music Awards in the category of Upcoming Male Vocalist of the Year in 2012 for his song "Tera Naam Japdi Phiran" from the film Cocktail followed by his nomination in Global Indian Music Awards in the category of Best Duet for the film Bhaag Milkha Bhaag.

References

1973 births
Bollywood playback singers
21st-century Pakistani male singers
Pakistani qawwali singers
Singers from Lahore
Urdu-language singers
Living people
Performers of Sufi music
Punjabi-language singers
Pakistani qawwali groups
Pakistani playback singers